John Kirk Marsh (8 October 1922 – 5 December 1997) was an English professional footballer who played as an inside forward.

Career
Born in Mansfield, Marsh played for Mansfield BC, Notts County, Coventry City, Leicester City, Chesterfield and Worksop Town.

References

1922 births
1997 deaths
English footballers
Notts County F.C. players
Coventry City F.C. players
Leicester City F.C. players
Chesterfield F.C. players
Worksop Town F.C. players
English Football League players
Association football inside forwards